Khalif Ahmed Ereg is a Somali politician. From July 2014 to January 2015, he served as the Minister of National Security of Somalia.

Personal life
Ereg hails from the Sacad Habar Gidir sub-clan of the Hawiye.

Career
Ereg previously served as the Banaadir regional security agency chief.

On 9 July 2014, Ereg was appointed Minister of National Security of Somalia by Prime Minister Abdiweli Sheikh Ahmed. He replaced Abdikarim Hussein Guled at the position.

On 27 January 2015, Ereg's term as Minister of National Security of Somalia ended, following the appointment of a new Cabinet by Prime Minister Omar Abdirashid Ali Sharmarke. He was succeeded at the position by Abdulkadir Sheikh Dini.

References

Government ministers of Somalia
Living people
Year of birth missing (living people)